Trenton Denzel Scott (born January 25, 1994) is an American football offensive tackle for the Pittsburgh Steelers of the National Football League (NFL). He played college football at Grambling State.

Early life and high school
Scott was born and grew up in Huntsville, Alabama and attended Lee High School. He was a three-time all-state selection and played with future Grambling teammate and NFL wide receiver Chester Rogers.

College career
Scott played five seasons for the Tigers, redshirting his sophomore season due to injury. Over the course of his entire college career, Scott gave up only three sacks. As a senior, Scott did not allow a single sack and tallied with 39 pancake blocks and 32 knockdowns and was named first team All-SWAC. He graduated with a degree in Sports Management as a junior and was working on a master's degree in Sports Administration during his senior season.

Professional career

Los Angeles Chargers
Scott was signed by Los Angeles Chargers as undrafted free agent in April 2018. He was cut from the 53-man roster at the end of training camp and subsequently signed to the Chargers' practice squad on September 2. Scott was promoted to the Chargers active roster on September 15. Scott made his NFL debut on September 23 against the Los Angeles Rams. He made his first career start at left tackle on October 7 against the Oakland Raiders in place of an injured Russell Okung. In his rookie season, Scott played in nine games with one start.

Scott began the 2019 season as the Chargers' starting left tackle after Okung was placed on the non-football injury list due to blood clots. He started the first seven games of the season and played in all 16 of the Chargers games with nine total starts, playing 78 percent of the Chargers offensive snaps (827) and giving up five sacks. Scott was assigned a one-year tender by the Chargers on March 17, 2020. He signed the tender on April 21, 2020. He was waived on September 5, 2020.

Carolina Panthers
On September 6, 2020, Scott was claimed off waivers by the Carolina Panthers. He was placed on the reserve/COVID-19 list by the Panthers on October 21, and was activated two days later. He started four games at left tackle for the Panthers in 2020 before being placed on injured reserve on December 28.

On February 23, 2021, Scott signed a one-year contract extension with the Panthers.

Pittsburgh Steelers
On May 13, 2022, Scott signed a one-year contract with the Pittsburgh Steelers.

References

External links
Los Angeles Chargers bio
Grambling State bio

1994 births
Living people
21st-century African-American sportspeople
Players of American football from Alabama
African-American players of American football
Sportspeople from Huntsville, Alabama
Grambling State Tigers football players
American football offensive tackles
Los Angeles Chargers players
Carolina Panthers players
Pittsburgh Steelers players